Jaime Víctor Alguersuari Escudero (born 23 March 1990), also known as Jaume Alguersuari, and Squire is a Spanish DJ and retired racing driver best known for competing in Formula One between  and , and for being the 2008 British Formula 3 champion. He is the son of Jaime Alguersuari, Sr., a former motorcyclist and racing driver.

Alguersuari became the youngest Formula One driver to start a Grand Prix in history at the 2009 Hungarian Grand Prix – at the age of 19 years, 125 days – and in the process, became the first driver to be born in the 1990s to compete in Formula One. This record was broken by Max Verstappen in 2015 who competed at just 17 years of age. After losing his drive with the Toro Rosso team in late 2011, Alguersuari joined British radio station BBC Radio 5 Live to be their expert summariser for the 2012 Formula One season, alongside lead commentator James Allen. At the age of 25, Alguersuari officially retired from motorsport to concentrate on his DJ career.

Career

Early years
Born in Barcelona, Spain, Alguersuari began his formula racing career, in the Italian Formula 1600 Junior Series, in 2005. In 2006, he won the Italian Formula Renault Winter Series, before finishing as runner-up to Mika Mäki in the main championship the following year.

Formula Three

He moved up to the British Formula Three Championship for 2008, driving for the Carlin Motorsport alongside teammates Brendon Hartley, Oliver Turvey and Sam Abay. After a season-long battle between Alguersuari, Hartley, Turvey and Sergio Pérez, Alguersuari won the final three races of the season to clinch the championship. He thus became the youngest title winner in championship history, aged 18 years and 203 days. He also deputised for the injured Mark Webber in the 2008 Race of Champions event at the Wembley Stadium in December 2008.

Formula Renault 3.5 Series
He competed in the Formula Renault 3.5 Series in 2009, continuing with the Carlin team and with Turvey once again as his teammate. At the time of his move to Formula One mid-season, he was eighth in the championship, with one podium finish, and was the second-highest rookie driver in the standings behind Turvey. Despite his promotion to an F1 race seat, he carried on in FR3.5. A week after his Formula One debut, Alguersuari returned to the series at the Autódromo Internacional do Algarve, and scored both his first pole, and his first victory in the series. His 27-point haul for the weekend moved him from eighth to third in the championship standings. Alguersuari eventually ended up sixth, dropping from third in the final race.

Formula One (2009–2011)

Scuderia Toro Rosso

2009

Alguersuari took over the role of reserve driver for the Red Bull Racing and Scuderia Toro Rosso Formula One teams from fellow Red Bull Junior driver Brendon Hartley in the second half of the 2009 Formula One season. Less than two weeks later, race driver Sébastien Bourdais left the Toro Rosso team after the 2009 German Grand Prix and Alguersuari was immediately expected to be his successor, despite the lack of an official confirmation. Four days later, Toro Rosso announced that Alguersuari would drive for the team at the 2009 Hungarian Grand Prix. He became the youngest ever Formula One driver at the age of 19 years and 125 days, breaking the record previously held by Mike Thackwell. He became only the seventh teenager to start a Grand Prix. Qualifying in last place following a mechanical problem, he finished the race in fifteenth, one place ahead of his teammate Sébastien Buemi. Through the rest of the season, he had little success, with his best result coming at the 2009 Brazilian Grand Prix, where he managed 14th place. At the remaining 8 races, he only finished 3 of them and retired in the other 5. During the season he also had a huge crash in the  while he was attempting to chase for his first points.

2010

Toro Rosso retained Alguersuari for the 2010 season, starting with a career-best finishes of thirteenth in Bahrain and eleventh in Australia including 22 laps battling with the 7 time world champion Michael Schumacher. In Malaysia one week later, Alguersuari scored his first ever Formula One points with a ninth-placed finish. Toro Rosso team principal Franz Tost praised Alguersuari's performance, saying the Spaniard "drove a fantastic race". Alguersuari then scored another point after finishing tenth at his home Grand Prix. In May, Alguersuari visited the Dominican Republic with his Red Bull team and became one of the first drivers to ever drive a Formula 1 vehicle on the beaches there. In the next 14 races, he only had one more points finish, at the final race of the year in Abu Dhabi.

2011

Toro Rosso confirmed that Alguersuari was to be retained alongside Sébastien Buemi for the 2011 season. After finishing the first two races outside the points, Alguersuari qualified inside the top ten for the first time in Formula One, with a seventh place grid start in China. These results came at a crucial time for Alguersuari, with Daniel Ricciardo being linked to replace Alguersuari for the  season. He qualified a career best 6th at the  before being forced to retire during the race after a first corner collision with Bruno Senna. He crashed out on the penultimate lap in Singapore, but was classified in 21st place. In Korea, Alguersuari finished seventh after passing Nico Rosberg on the final lap, and added another eighth-place finish in India.

Following the last race of the season in Brazil, Alguersuari won the Desafio Internacional das Estrelas karting event, organised by Felipe Massa.

Formula E

Virgin (2014/15)

Alguersuari commented by 2013 that he would not be trying to return to Formula One. The same week he contested a round of the CIK-FIA KZ world karting championship.

Later, he became part of the Formula E Drivers' Club, enabling him to be picked by any of the Formula E teams to race with them. In March 2014, Alguersuari announced that he would compete with Virgin Racing, joining Sam Bird for the season. Alguersuari got a best finish of fourth at the 2015 Buenos Aires ePrix but only scored points on four occasions throughout the season. He had a single retirement at the 2015 Monaco ePrix where he was caught up in the first lap collision. Alguersuari had to miss the final two rounds of the season due to minor health issues which caused him to faint at the end of the 2015 Moscow ePrix and was replaced by Fabio Leimer. Alguersuari finished the season with 30 points and placed 13th in the championship.

Departure from motorsport
On 1 October 2015, Alguersuari officially retired from all forms of motorsport, explaining that he had "fallen out of love with this girlfriend".

Return to karting 
Being in his first season of Formula One Alguersuari also participated in the CIK-FIA World Cup - KZ1 in 2009, where he was 23rd.

Alguersuari also competed in the Desafio Internacional das Estrelas in 2010 (where he was sixth), 2011 (where he won) and 2013 (seventeenth).

In 2013, already out of Formula One, he participated in the CIK-FIA World KZ Championship, where he was ninth.

In 2021, years after announcing his retirement from motorsports, the Spanish driver decided to return to competition, participating in the Spanish karting championship. However, in the first race of the season at the Campillos circuit, he finished third, but suffered a rib fracture that prevented him from participating in most of the season and cut short his aspirations to participate in the world championship and the European karting championship. He returned in the last race of the season in Zuera, Zaragoza, in October where he managed to win the race. In November, he participated in the Winter Cup in Lonato, finishing 15th after climbing 10 positions

In 2022, Alguersuari took part of the Margutti trophy, finishing 16th after climbing 14 positions and setting the fastest lap. He also returned to participate in the Spanish karting championship

DJ career
In addition to driving racing cars, Alguersuari has his own recording studio in Barcelona, and is well known in Spain as a DJ, under the stage name Squire (in reference to his second surname Escudero). Alguersuari headlined the 2010 Barcelona Music Conference and has played sets at clubs including Amnesia in Ibiza. His debut album Organic Life was released by Blanco y Negro Records on 14 September 2011, and topped the iTunes album chart five days after its release.

In 2019, he released the album The Leftovers of Stars Collide in collaboration with Pablo Bolívar and in 2021 Squire released STOP, his new album.

Racing record

Career summary

 As Alguersuari was a guest driver, he was ineligible to score points.

Complete Formula Renault 3.5 Series results
(key) (Races in bold indicate pole position, races in italics indicate fastest lap)

† – Retired, but classified

Complete Formula One results
(key) (Races in bold indicate pole position; races in italics indicate fastest lap)

 Did not finish, but was classified as he had completed more than 90% of the race distance.

Complete Formula E results
(key) (Races in bold indicate pole position; races in italics indicate fastest lap)

References

External links

  
 
 Alguersuari's YouTube channel

1990 births
Living people
Racing drivers from Barcelona
Italian Formula Renault 2.0 drivers
Formula Renault Eurocup drivers
British Formula Three Championship drivers
Euroformula Open Championship drivers
Spanish Formula One drivers
Catalan Formula One drivers
Toro Rosso Formula One drivers
World Series Formula V8 3.5 drivers
ADAC GT Masters drivers
Formula E drivers
Stock Car Brasil drivers
Electronic dance music DJs
Club DJs
Carlin racing drivers
Spanish racing drivers
Epsilon Euskadi drivers
Cram Competition drivers
Rowe Racing drivers
Envision Virgin Racing drivers
Spanish DJs
Karting World Championship drivers
Italian Formula Renault 1.6 drivers